Thorney Island may refer to:

 Thorney Island (Westminster), a former eyot in the River Thames
 Thorney Island (West Sussex), an island in Chichester Harbour